Maisa-Phoka is a community council located in the Leribe District of Lesotho. Its population in 2006 was 12,630.

Villages
The community of Maisa-Phoka includes the villages of Futhong, Ha Libenyane, Ha Makakamela (Nkoeng), Ha Makhobalo (Losemaecheri), Ha Mashili, Ha Mokotjo, Ha Molapo, Ha Morallana (Tlhakoli), Ha Motšoane, Ha Phiri (Fing), Ha Seheshe (Tlhakoli), Ha Teketsi, Ha Thaba, Ha Totoloane, Kotope, Letsatseng (Tlhakoli), Letsoapong (Liphofung), Letsoapong (Matlakeng), Likoting, Linokong, Liphakoeng (Ha Mashili), Literapeng, Mahana-Puso, Makhasane, Maruatona, Matlakeng, Matomokong (Tlhakoli), Metsoaneng, Mohlanapeng, Moreneng (Matlakeng), Naleli, Nkoeng (Ha Makakamela), Poping (Tlhakoli), Sekhutloaneng (Tlhakoli), Taung (Ha Rampai), Thabana-Tšooana, Thotaneng, Thotaneng (Liphofung) and Thotaneng (Matlakeng).

References

External links
 Google map of community villages

Populated places in Leribe District